The House of Nassau-Corroy is a bastard branch of the House of Nassau. Unlike the main branch of the House of Nassau, this illegitimate branch was faithful to the king of Spain and Roman Catholic.

History 

The history of the Branch of Corroy was started by the marriage between Otto II of Nassau-Siegen and Adelaide of Vianden. The counts of Vianden built the castle of Corroy in the 13th century. Thus, the ancestors of Henry III already possessed the rights of the Chateau in Corroy.
The branch of Nassau-Corroy was founded by Alexis of Nassau-Corroy, the illegitimate son of Henry III of Nassau-Breda and his mistress Elisabeth Claire van Rosenbach. Alexis was recognised by emperor Charles V in 1530. In 1540 René of Chalon gave the full rights of Corroy to his half-brother. In 1545 the branch was openly recognised by the Prince of Orange. In 1693 Charles II created Joseph-Ignace 1st Count of Corroy. In 1717 the Counts of Corroy added Zwevegem to their possessions and were the last feudal lords in Zwevegem. The familial crest is still the official coat of arms of the municipality Zwevegem.

Lords and Counts of Corroy

Alexis I of Nassau-Corroy: Legitimised bastard in 1530. Married to Wilhelmina of Bronkhorst Batenburg (1526 - 1601) 
René of Nassau-Corroy
Alexis II of Nassau-Corroy
Maximilien of Nassau-Corroy
Joseph-Ignace de Nassau, 1st Count of Corroy;acquired the castle of Zwevegem and the title of Count of Zwevegem; married to Marrie-Anne, daughter of Philippe I Alexandre de Ghistelles, 2nd Marquess of Saint-Floris.
Guillaume-Adrien-Joseph de Nassau, Count of Corroyson of Joseph-Ignace, succeeded his father in 1740
Alexandre-Constantin-Joseph de Nassau, Count of Corroy (1738-1804) son of Guillaume-Adrien; he was the last count of Zwevegem

Others 
Charles-Florent-Marie de Nassau, Count of Corroy, younger brother of Alexandre, died in 1809
Amélie-Constance-Marie de Nassau-Corroy, daughter and only descendant of Charles, married in 1803 Gillion, the Marquess of Trazegnies d'Ittre, who inherited the castle of Corroy. The death of Amélie in 1832 signified the end of the noble family of Nassau-Corroy.

Notes

Roman Catholic families
House of Nassau
Illegitimate children of monarchs
People from Gembloux
1530 establishments in the Habsburg Netherlands
1832 disestablishments in the Netherlands